Roger Douglas Groot (1942–2005) was the Class of 1975 Alumni Professor of Law at Washington and Lee University School of Law in Lexington, Virginia, where he had taught since 1973.  Prior to graduating law school, he'd served six years in the United States Marine Corps, including a tour in Vietnam as an advisor to the Army of the Republic of Vietnam.   He was an expert in criminal law and procedure, and the death penalty. Groot had been appointed counsel in several Virginia capital cases, appointed as defense legal analyst in federal death penalty cases, and consulted in several hundred capital cases, including Lee Boyd Malvo (Beltway Sniper) and Peter Odighizuwa (Appalachian School of Law shooting). At the time of Groot's death, none of his clients had been sent to death row.

New York Times reporter Jayson Blair wrote an article about Groot's defense of Malvo. However, the New York Times later noted that this article was among those where Blair misrepresented himself. Despite the byline stating that Blair was reporting from Lexington, VA, he did not go to Lexington and only interviewed Groot on the phone.

Groot earned his B.A. degree from Vanderbilt University in 1963, and his J.D. degree from the University of North Carolina at Chapel Hill in 1971.

Groot authored many law review articles on criminal law/procedure topics, especially the early history of trial by jury.

Groot regularly lectured at death penalty CLE programs, and was a member of the faculty, Virginia Death Penalty College. He was a frequent speaker to bar groups and specialty bars such as the Virginia Trial Lawyers Association and the Virginia College of Criminal Defense Attorneys.

Groot was a member of Phi Beta Kappa, Order of the Coif, a member of the Board of Governors of the Virginia Bar Association, and a Fellow of the Virginia Law Foundation.  He died while hunting at the age of 63 on November 12, 2005, of a cardiac arrhythmia caused by idiopathic dilated cardiomyopathy.

Virginia Senate Joint Resolution No. 18 honors the life of Groot.

References

1942 births
2005 deaths
American legal scholars
Vanderbilt University alumni
University of North Carolina School of Law alumni
Washington and Lee University School of Law faculty